Jeffrey Osborne is the debut studio album by American singer Jeffrey Osborne. It was released by A&M Records on May 18, 1982. His solo debut after leaving his band L.T.D. for a solo career, Osborne worked with George Duke on the majority of the album, though legal issues had initially prevented him from signing his solo deal with A&M for a whole year.

Critical reception

AllMusic editor Jason Elias found that "unlike countless other acts who [went solo, Osborne's] self-titled release proves that it was a great decision. Producer George Duke offered Osborne an up-to-the-minute sound with a collection of great studio players ranging from drummer  Steve Ferrone to bassist Louis Johnson [...] This is an impressive solo debut from one of R&B and pop's best vocalists."

Chart performance
The album reached number 49 on the US Billboard 200 along with three singles, "On the Wings of Love", "I Really Don't Need No Light" and "Eenie Meenie" peaking at numbers 29, 39 and 76 on the Billboard Hot 100, respectively. "On the Wings of Love" also reached number 23 on the Cash Box Top 100 as well as number 7 on the US Adult Contemporary chart, and number 11 in the United Kingdom.

Track listing
All tracks produced by George Duke.

Personnel 
Performers and musicians

 Jeffrey Osborne – lead vocals (all tracks), vocal arrangements (all tracks), rhythm arrangements (1, 4, 5, 7-10), backing vocals (2-10), handclaps (5, 6, 8), horn arrangements (5, 8), vocoder (6)
 George Duke – rhythm arrangements (1, 4, 8, 10), acoustic piano (1, 4, 8, 10), synthesizers (2, 3, 7), acoustic piano solo (2), handclaps (5), horn arrangements (5, 8, 10), vocoder (6), bells (7)
 John Barnes – electric piano (2, 7), organ (5)
 Bobby Lyle – electric piano (3)
 Ron Kersey – rhythm arrangements (5), electric piano (9)
 Michael Sembello – guitar (1-4, 10), rhythm arrangements (2)
 Charles Fearing – guitar (3, 5)
 Paul Jackson Jr. – guitar (7)
 David T. Walker – guitar (7, 9)
 Louis Johnson – bass (1, 2, 3, 5, 7, 8)
 Abraham Laboriel – bass (4, 10)
 Larry Graham – bass (6, 9)
 Steve Ferrone – drums (all tracks)
 Paulinho Da Costa – cowbell (1), percussion (2, 3, 5, 6, 8), handclaps (6, 8)
 Sheila E. – handclaps (5)
 Tony Maiden – handclaps (6, 8)
 Ernie Watts – tenor saxophone solo (1)
 Larry Williams – tenor saxophone (1, 5, 6, 8), flute (10), piccolo (10)
 Lew McCreary – trombone (1, 5, 6, 8)
 Gary Grant – trumpet (1, 5, 6, 8, 10)
 Jerry Hey – trumpet (1, 5, 6, 8, 10), horn arrangements (1, 5, 6, 8)
 Bobby Martin – French horn (2, 10)
 George Del Barrio – string arrangements (2, 4, 7, 9)
 Paul Shure – concertmaster (2, 3, 4, 7, 9)
 David "Hawk" Wolinski – rhythm arrangements (3)
 Len Ron Hanks – rhythm arrangements (7)
 Arif Mardin – orchestration (10)
 Lynn Davis – backing vocals (3, 8, 9)

Technical

 Chuck Beeson – art direction
 Wally Buck – assistant engineer
 George Duke – producer
 Bernie Faccone – assistant engineer
 Matt Forger – assistant engineer
 Bernie Grundman – mastering engineer
 Bobby Holland – photography
 Lynn Robb – art direction, design
 Robert Spano – assistant engineer
 Nick Spigel – assistant engineer
 Tommy Vicari – mixing engineer (tracks 2, 4, 5, 7 & 10)
 Erik Zobler – engineer (tracks 1, 3, 6, 8 & 9)
Bobby Holland - photography

Charts

Weekly charts

Year-end charts

References

1982 debut albums
Jeffrey Osborne albums
A&M Records albums
Albums produced by George Duke